Yazdan or Yezdan may refer to:

 Yezdan, Fars, a village in central Iran
 Hesar-e Yazdan, a village in eastern Iran
 Yazdelan, or Yazdan, (يزدلان), a village in central Iran

See also
 Yazd, the capital of Yazd Province in central Iran
 Yazdani (disambiguation)
 Yazdânism, a Kurdish religion
 yazata, Zoroastrian Iranian divine entities from which the words Yazdan or Yezdan derive